James Fisher-Harris (born 5 January 1996) is a New Zealand professional rugby league footballer who plays as a  and  forward for the Penrith Panthers in the NRL, and New Zealand and the New Zealand Māori at international level.  He is a dual NRL premiership winning player of 2021 and 2022.

Background
Fisher-Harris was born in Kohukohu, New Zealand. He is of Māori descent.

Fisher-Harris played his junior rugby league for the Whangarei Marist Brothers, before being signed by the Penrith Panthers.

Playing career

Early career
Fisher-Harris joined Penrith in 2013 as a member of their S. G. Ball Cup team. In 2014 and 2015, Fisher-Harris played for the Penrith Panthers' NYC team. 

On 2 May 2015, he played for the Junior Kiwis, against the Junior Kangaroos, starting at prop in the 22-20 loss at Robina Stadium. On 15 May 2015, Fisher-Harris re-signed with the Penrith club on a three-year contract. On 4 October 2015, Fisher-Harris played in the 2015 Holden Cup Grand final against the Manly-Warringah Sea Eagles, starting at second-row in the 34-18 victory.

2016
In Round 1 of the 2016 NRL season, Fisher-Harris made his NRL debut for the Penrith club against the Canberra Raiders, playing off the interchange bench in Penrith's 30-22 loss at Canberra Stadium. In Round 8 against the Cronulla-Sutherland Sharks, Fisher-Harris scored his first and second NRL career tries in the 20-18 loss at Shark Park. On 2 June 2016, Fisher-Harris extended his contract with the Penrith club from the end of 2018 to the end of 2019. Fisher-Harris finished his debut year in the NRL with him playing in 23 matches and scoring 5 tries for the Penrith club in the 2016 NRL season. 

On 22 September 2016, Fisher-Harris was rewarded for his impressive debut season with selection in the New Zealand national rugby league team 24-man squad for the 2016 Four Nations. 

On 11 November 2016, Fisher-Harris made his international debut for New Zealand against Scotland, playing off the interchange bench in the shock 18-18 all draw at Derwent Park in Workington, England. This was the only match that Fisher-Harris played in the tournament.

2017
On 21 January 2017, Fisher-Harris was named the junior player of the year by the New Zealand Rugby League. 

Fisher-Harris finished the 2017 NRL season with him playing in 15 matches, missing a chunk of matches due to eye, shoulder and hamstring injuries.

2018
Fisher-Harris made 25 appearances for Penrith in 2018 as the club finished 5th on the table and qualified for the finals.  Fisher-Harris played in both finals matches as Penrith were eliminated in week two by Cronulla-Sutherland 21-20.

2019
Fisher-Harris made a total of 24 appearances for Penrith in the 2019 NRL season and scored two tries as the club finished 10th on the table and missed out on the finals for the first time since 2015.

2020
Fisher-Harris played 22 games for Penrith as the club won the Minor Premiership. Fisher-Harris played in the 2020 NRL Grand Final which Penrith lost 26-20 against Melbourne.

2021
On 27 September, Fisher-Harris was named Dally M Prop of the year alongside Brisbane's Payne Haas.
Fisher-Harris played a total of 24 games for Penrith in the 2021 NRL season including the club's 2021 NRL Grand Final victory over South Sydney.

2022
In round 21 of the 2022 NRL season, Fisher-Harris was sent to the sin bin for a dangerous high tackle in Penrith's victory over Canberra.

Fisher-Harris played 23 games for Penrith throughout the year including the 2022 NRL Grand Final victory over Parramatta. The following day at the post grand final celebrations, Fisher-Harris said “I just want to say Parra are our sons, Right here right now that’s just a fact".  Fisher-Harris said this in relation to teammate Jarome Luai declaring before and after the grand final that Penrith were Parramatta's "Daddy".

In October he was named in the New Zealand squad for the 2021 Rugby League World Cup.

In November he was named in the 2021 RLWC Team of the Tournament.

2023
On 18 February, Fisher-Harris played in Penrith's 13-12 upset loss to St Helens RFC in the 2023 World Club Challenge.

References

External links

Penrith Panthers profile

1996 births
Living people
New Zealand sportspeople of Samoan descent
New Zealand rugby league players
New Zealand Māori rugby league players
New Zealand national rugby league team players
New Zealand national rugby league team captains
New Zealand Māori rugby league team players
Penrith Panthers players
Penrith Panthers captains
Junior Kiwis players
Rugby league locks
Rugby league players from Northland Region
Rugby league props
Rugby league second-rows